In computer networking davfs2 is a Linux tool for connecting to WebDAV shares as though they were local disks. It is an open-source GPL-licensed file system for mounting WebDAV servers. It uses the FUSE file system API to communicate with the kernel and the neon WebDAV library for communicating with the web server.

Applications 

davfs2 is e.g. used with the Apache web server, and Subversion installations.

See also 

 WebDAV
 FUSE

References

External links

 (old resources)

Free special-purpose file systems
Userspace file systems
Network file systems